Anastasia Muñoz  is an American voice actress affiliated with Funimation. She has provided voices for a number of English-language versions of Japanese anime films and television series. Her major characters include Tobias in .hack//Quantum, Koko Hekmatyar in Jormungand, Shiena Kenmochi in Riddle Story of Devil, Aria in The Sacred Blacksmith, and Minna-Dietlinde Wilcke in Strike Witches.

Filmography

Anime

Video games

References

External links
 
 
 

Living people
1984 births
21st-century American actresses
American stage actresses
American theatre directors
Women theatre directors
Place of birth missing (living people)
American video game actresses
American voice actresses
University of Alabama alumni
Actresses from Dallas
American actresses of Mexican descent
Hispanic and Latino American actresses